Coprinellus radians is a species of mushroom in the family Psathyrellaceae. First described as Agaricus radians by the mycologist John Baptiste Henri Joseph Desmazières in 1828, it was later transferred to the genus Coprinellus in 2001.

References

radians
Fungi described in 1828
Taxa named by John Baptiste Henri Joseph Desmazières